Mark L. Zieman (born January 14, 1945) was a Republican Iowa State Senator from Iowa. He was formerly part of the leadership of the Iowa Senate. He represented the largely rural 8th district, covering Allamakee, Winneshiek, Chickasaw and Howard counties in the northeastern corner of the state. He served in the Iowa Senate 2001–2009 and was a past co-chair of the Senate Ways and Means Committee.

Prior to his election to state office, he worked with various local government, Republican, and community organizations. His father was the previous state senator from his district.

Zieman was re-elected in 2004 with 15,682 votes (55%), defeating Democratic opponent John Beard.  He was an unsuccessful candidate in the Iowa Senate elections, 2008.

Committees
State Government, Ranking member
Education
Judiciary
Rules and Administration
Transportation
Ways and Means
Education Appropriations Subcommittee

References

External links
Iowa General Assembly - Senator Mark Zieman official IA Senate website
Project Vote Smart - Mark Zieman profile
Follow the Money - Mark Zieman
2006 2004 2002 2000 campaign contributions
Iowa Senate Republicans - Mark Zieman profile

Online newspapers in the 8th district
Decorah
Waukon & Postville

Republican Party Iowa state senators
1945 births
Living people
American Lutherans
People from Postville, Iowa